Abdel Fadel Suanon (born 24 June 1995) is a Beninese professional footballer who plays for Al Kharaitiyat as a striker.

Suanon scored ten goals for Damac during the 2017–18 season.

References

External links 
 
 

1995 births
Living people
Beninese footballers
Beninese expatriate footballers
Benin international footballers
Association football forwards
Étoile Sportive du Sahel players
Mogas 90 FC players
JS Kairouan players
Damac FC players
Al-Washm Club players
Free State Stars F.C. players
Al Kharaitiyat SC players
Tunisian Ligue Professionnelle 1 players
Saudi First Division League players
Saudi Second Division players
National First Division players
Qatari Second Division players
Expatriate footballers in Tunisia
Expatriate footballers in Saudi Arabia
Expatriate soccer players in South Africa
Expatriate footballers in Qatar
Beninese expatriate sportspeople in Tunisia
Beninese expatriate sportspeople in South Africa